Nathan Jonas "Joey" Jordison (April 26, 1975 – July 26, 2021) was an American musician. He was the original drummer and co-founder of the heavy metal band Slipknot, in which he was designated #1, and the guitarist for the horror punk supergroup Murderdolls. 

Jordison grew up in Des Moines, Iowa, with his parents and two sisters, and was given his first drum kit at the age of 8. He performed with many bands early in his career; then in 1995, he joined a band called the Pale Ones, which would later change their name and become Slipknot. Jordison played in Slipknot since its inception, helping form the band until his departure in December of 2013. Of Slipknot's nine-member lineup, which lasted from 1999–2010, Joey was the third to join the band. He was the drummer and founder of Scar the Martyr, which formed in 2013 and disbanded in 2016. 

With Slipknot, Jordison performed on the band's first four studio albums, and produced the 2005 live album 9.0: Live. Outside his major projects, Jordison performed with other acts such as Rob Zombie, Metallica, Korn, Ministry, Otep, and Satyricon. Jordison was also known for his session work, which includes performances on various recordings for many artists. Jordison used several drum brands including Pearl, and ddrum. At the time of his death, Jordison was playing in the blackened death metal supergroup Sinsaenum.

Early life
Jordison was born in Des Moines, Iowa, on April 26, 1975, to Steve and Jackie Jordison. He had two younger sisters. He grew up in a rural area outside of Waukee where he used to play basketball on the street in front of his house. He embraced music at an early age, which he attributes to his parents' influence: "They always sat me down in front of the radio, rather than the TV." He played guitar until receiving his first drum kit as a gift from his parents at age eight, and started his first band while in elementary school.

Jordison's parents divorced when he was young. The children stayed with their mother. His mother remarried and set up a funeral parlor where Jordison would occasionally help. Jordison stated that he felt a sudden responsibility to be the man of the house. During this time, he formed the band Modifidious, in which he played drums. He later described them as "total speed-metal thrash". The band helped Jordison break new ground, playing live as support to local bands including Atomic Opera, featuring Jim Root, and Heads on the Wall, featuring Shawn Crahan. He also played at a bowling center his family owned, on a night called "Bowl-O-Rama". After a multitude of lineup changes—including Craig Jones and Josh Brainard, who would reappear in Slipknot—the band released two demos in 1993: Visceral and Mud Fuchia.

After leaving school, Jordison was hired by a local music store called Musicland. In March 1994, after a recommendation from his new friend, he got a job at a Sinclair garage in Urbandale. Jordison worked the night shift, which he preferred, as it left his weekends free and allowed him to spend time with his friends and listen to music while working. In early 1995, Modifidious disbanded because of a shift in interest from thrash metal to death metal in America. Following this Jordison joined a local band called the Rejects as a guitarist, with whom he only played a couple of shows. Jordison was also involved in a band with future bandmate Paul Gray and vocalist Don Decker, named Anal Blast. Gray also attempted to recruit him for another band, Body Pit, but he declined the invitation to remain in the Rejects. During the forming period of Slipknot, Paul recruited Joey to join a punk rock band called the Have Nots in the Spring of 1996. Joey would leave the Have Nots in February 1997 to "focus on Slipknot" but instead reformed the Rejects, which would play Des Moines up until Slipknot left to record their 1999 self-titled debut album, which Paul played in after the Have Nots broke up.

Career

Slipknot

On November 28, 1995, Mark Anthony Cadavos approached Jordison while he was working, offering him a position in a new project called the Pale Ones. Intrigued and at a point where he was "lost", Jordison attended rehearsals at Anders Colsefni's basement and immediately wanted to be part of this new band. Speaking of this moment he said, "I remember trying so hard not to smile, so I didn't look like I wanted to join, I remained poker-faced, but I thought they ruled." A lot of Slipknot's early development was discussed by band members while Jordison worked night shifts at Sinclair's garage. Of the eventual nine members, Joey was the third to join the band. Slipknot would become pioneers to the new wave of American heavy metal. Jordison was accompanied by two custom percussionists, giving their music a feel that Rolling Stone touted as "suffocating".

Each member of Slipknot is assigned a number; Joey was assigned "#1". Joey produced one album with Slipknot: 2005 live album 9.0: Live. In August 2008, Jordison broke his ankle and Slipknot had to cancel some of its English tour dates. On August 22, 2009, Jordison was taken to the emergency room for a burst appendix, less than an hour before he was to take the stage for Auburn, Washington's KISW Pain in the Grass concert. As a result, Slipknot canceled following shows in August and September, to give Jordison time to recover.

On December 12, 2013, Slipknot announced through their official website that Jordison had left the band, citing personal reasons for his departure. In response, Jordison released a statement insisting that he had in fact been fired from the band and stated that Slipknot "has been my life for the last 18 years, and I would never abandon it, or my fans".

After years of both sides being silent and evasive as to the reasons for his leaving the band, Jordison revealed in June 2016 that he suffered from transverse myelitis, a neurological disease that cost him the ability to play the drums toward the end of his time with Slipknot.

Murderdolls

While touring Ozzfest in 2001 to support Slipknot's studio album Iowa, Jordison met Tripp Eisen, then of Static-X; the two discussed forming a side project. In 2002, Jordison revived his band The Rejects, renaming them the Murderdolls. Jordison became the Murderdolls' guitarist, and he recruited Wednesday 13 of Frankenstein Drag Queens from Planet 13 to play bass. Wednesday eventually became a vocalist, while drummer Ben Graves and bassist Eric Griffin completed the band's lineup. Murderdolls signed with Roadrunner Records and released an EP entitled Right to Remain Violent in 2002. The band returned in August 2002 with their debut album Beyond the Valley of the Murderdolls. The band uses horror films, including Friday the 13th and Night of the Living Dead, as an inspiration for their lyrics. On October 30, 2002, the Murderdolls made an appearance on an episode of Dawson's Creek entitled "Living Dead Girl". The band reunited in 2010 with only Jordison and Wednesday 13 remaining from the original line-up. The band released their second studio album Women & Children Last on August 31, 2010. The band embarked on the extensive Women & Children Last World Tour performing shows alongside many notable acts such as Guns N' Roses and performing around the world. The tour was plagued with many problems including the cancellation of many shows and repeated incidents of Jordison storming off stage, most notably in Bordeaux, France (attributed to extreme tinnitus) and Perth, Western Australia. The tour finished on April 24, 2011. This was considered to be the band's last outing as Wednesday 13 confirmed the band's split in an interview in March 2013.

Scar the Martyr

In April 2013 details emerged of a new band featuring Jordison, Jed Simon and Kris Norris. Little else was released except that Jordison had performed most instruments in this project and that Chris Vrenna and an unknown vocalist were to complete keyboard and vocal work, respectively. On June 21 the band was named Scar the Martyr and the vocalist named as Henry Derek. On May 5, 2016, Jordison announced that the project had been disbanded.

Vimic
On May 5, 2016, Jordison announced in an interview on Sirius XM that he had launched a new band called Vimic. In an interview with Wall of Sound in 2018, Jordison explained Vimic was "still 100% active".

Sinsaenum
On May 20, 2016, Jordison announced a new extreme metal band Sinsaenum, dual fronted by vocalist Attila Csihar (of Mayhem and Sunn O)))) along with keyboardist Sean Zitarsky (of Chimaira and Dååth). The band also included Jordison on drum duties, DragonForce bassist Frédéric Leclercq on guitar, Stéphane Buriez from Loudblast on guitar, and Heimoth from the band Seth on bass. They announced the launch of their debut album Echoes of the Tortured on July 29, and released their first single "Army Of Chaos" on earMUSIC's YouTube channel. The second album, called Repulsion for Humanity, was released on August 10, 2018.

Other projects

Remixing and performances
In 2001, Jordison worked on a remix of "The Fight Song" by Marilyn Manson. Jordison also appeared in the music video for Manson's cover of "Tainted Love". Later in the year, Manson revealed that Jordison had been working with him on his album The Golden Age of Grotesque. Jordison had in fact worked on guitars but the track did not appear on the album. In 2004, Jordison appeared on OTEP's album House of Secrets, drumming on six tracks for the album. In 2008, Jordison appeared on Puscifer's album "V" is for Viagra. The Remixes, with a remix of the track "Drunk With Power". In 2010, Jordison recorded four additional songs with Rob Zombie for the re-release of his latest album Hellbilly Deluxe 2.

On tour
Jordison performed with other bands, solely as a touring member. While preparing for the Download Festival in 2004, Metallica drummer Lars Ulrich was hospitalized for an unknown illness. Metallica's vocalist James Hetfield searched amongst other bands performing at the festival to find a replacement for Ulrich; Jordison, Flemming Larsen (Ulrich's drum technician) and Dave Lombardo of Slayer volunteered. Jordison performed on 8 of the 13 songs that made up the set and was called the band's "hero of the day". In late 2004, Jordison performed with Satyricon on their tour of the United States when drummer Frost was refused entry into the country. The tour was cut short after guitarists Steinar Gundersen and Arnt Gronbech—who were also only touring members—were charged with sexually assaulting a fan in Toronto. In 2006, Jordison joined Ministry for their "MasterBaTour 2006", which consisted of sixty dates across the United States and Canada. He also appeared in the music video for their single "Lies Lies Lies". Korn recruited Jordison in 2007 to join them on tour when drummer David Silveria went on hiatus from the band. He also appeared in the music video for their single "Evolution". While touring with Korn, Jordison became the first musician to perform on five occasions at the Download Festival in England. Jordison also began touring with Rob Zombie after Tommy Clufetos withdrew from the band. Although the position was initially only meant for a couple of months, Jordison stayed with the band for almost a year until the culmination of Zombie's Australian tour when he announced that he would be leaving to focus his time on the Murderdolls and Slipknot.

Producing
In August 2004, Jordison became involved in Roadrunner United, a celebration of Roadrunner Records 25th anniversary. As one of four "team captains" who wrote and produced material for the album, Jordison said of the experience, "I thought it was a great idea and was really excited about it, because it was a chance to work with a lot of artists that I really respected while I was growing up." In 2007, 3 Inches of Blood recruited Jordison to produce their album Fire Up the Blades. Jordison was a fan of the band and when he heard that Roadrunner wanted to have some demos produced he said; "I was the first one to jump at it, I'm like; 'I want this fucking band'." From these demos the label commissioned a record.  Vocalist Jamie Hopper said of Jordison, "he's an amazing producer".

Influences
Jordison cited Keith Moon (formerly of the Who), John Bonham (formerly of Led Zeppelin), Gene Krupa, and Buddy Rich as his main influences. He said, "I grew up listening to Mötley Crüe's Too Fast for Love and Shout at the Devil." He described Lars Ulrich (of Metallica), Charlie Benante (of Anthrax), and Dave Lombardo (formerly of Slayer) as having a considerable influence on his drumming. Jordison also held Dale Crover of Melvins in high esteem.

Equipment
Jordison used Pearl drums, hardware, rack system, pedals and percussion, Paiste cymbals, Remo Drumheads, Promark drumsticks, ddrum triggers and Roland electronics.

(Jordison used Orange County Drum and Percussion at 1998-2002, Sabian Cymbals at 1999-2001, Avedis Zildjian Company at 1999)

Illness and death 
In a 2016 Metal Hammer interview, Jordison talked about suffering from acute transverse myelitis. Its symptoms started in 2010 while touring with Murderdolls, but the disease was diagnosed long after. This progressed to the loss of the use of his left leg. The neurological disease had cost him the use of his legs and caused him to be unable to play the drums before rehabilitation. He recovered with the aid of medical help and physical therapy, with his trainer Caleb.

Jordison died in his sleep on July 26, 2021, at the age of 46, as stated by his family the next day.

Awards and recognition
In August 2010 Jordison was voted the best drummer of the previous 25 years by readers of Rhythm magazine, ahead of drummers such as Mike Portnoy, Neil Peart, and Phil Collins. When asked to comment he stated "I'm at a loss for words. This is beyond unbelievable. Something like this reminds me every day why I continue to do this."

As voted on by 6,500 drummers worldwide, Jordison won the Drummies Award for Best Metal drummer in 2010.

In September 2013 Jordison was named the world's greatest metal drummer by readers of Loudwire.

In 2016 Jordison was honored with The Golden God Award at the Metal Hammer Golden Gods Awards.

Following Jordison’s death in 2021; multiple tributes went public from musicians such as: Mike Portnoy, Alex Skolnick of Testament, Fred Durst of Limp Bizkit, Dave Lombardo, Lars Ulrich, Ben Thatcher of Royal Blood, and multiple others.

In 2022 Slipknot dedicated their seventh studio album The End, So Far in memory of Jordison.

Discography

with Modifidious 
Drown (1993)
Submitting to Detriment (1993)
Visceral (1993)
Mud Fuchia (1994)
Sprawl (1994)

with the Have Nots 
Forgetting Yesterday and Beating You with Kindness (1996)

with Slipknot 

Mate. Feed. Kill. Repeat. (1996, demo)
Slipknot demo (1998)
Slipknot (1999)
Welcome to Our Neighborhood (1999, video)
Iowa (2001)
Disasterpieces (2002, video)
Vol. 3: (The Subliminal Verses) (2004)
9.0 Live (2005, live album)
Voliminal: Inside the Nine (2006, video)
All Hope Is Gone (2008)
(sic)nesses (2010, video)
Antennas to Hell (2012, compilation album)

with Murderdolls 
Right to Remain Violent (EP) (2002)
Beyond the Valley of the Murderdolls (2002)
Women and Children Last (2010)

with Roadrunner United 
The All-Star Sessions (2005)
The Concert (2008)

with the Rejects 
Love Songs for People Who Hate (2012)
Strung Out, Pissed Off and Ready To Die (2014)

with Scar the Martyr 
Revolver EP (2013)
Metal Hammer EP (2013)
Scar the Martyr (2013)

with Sinsaenum 

 Sinsaenum (EP) (2016)
 A Taste of Sin (EP) (2016)
 Echoes of the Tortured (2016)
 Ashes (EP) (2017)
 Repulsion for Humanity (2018)

As featured artist

Filmography

References

Bibliography

Further reading 

 Joey Jordison obituary in The Guardian
 Joey Jordison obituary in Rolling Stone

External links

 Official website
 Tribute website by Jordison's family 
 Slipknot official website
 
 Joey Jordison's Pearl Artist Page
 

 
 

1975 births
2021 deaths
American heavy metal drummers
American rock guitarists
Grammy Award winners
Musicians from Des Moines, Iowa
Ministry (band) members
Murderdolls members
Horror punk musicians
Nu metal drummers
Writers from Des Moines, Iowa
Roadrunner Records artists
Slipknot (band) members
Lead guitarists
People from Waukee, Iowa
American multi-instrumentalists
Record producers from Iowa
American rock songwriters
American male songwriters
Songwriters from Iowa
American male drummers
American male guitarists
Guitarists from Iowa
20th-century American drummers
21st-century American drummers
Sinsaenum members